Arthur Thomas Jackson (19 May 1877 – 1960) was a British sports shooter. He competed for the British Olympic team at the 1908 Summer Olympics. He fought in World War I and was injured three times. As of 1918, he was a Lieutenant Colonel, and had earned a third bar for his Distinguished Service Order.

References

 

1877 births
1960 deaths
British male sport shooters
Olympic shooters of Great Britain
Shooters at the 1908 Summer Olympics
Place of birth missing
British Army officers
Companions of the Distinguished Service Order
British Army personnel of World War I
People from the London Borough of Islington